John Moe (born July 10, 1968) is an American writer and radio personality.

Early life
Moe grew up in Federal Way, Washington and graduated from Whitman College.

Career
Moe was originally hired at KUOW in 2001 as a staff writer for Rewind, a national news and satire show hosted by Weekend Americas Bill Radke. He was the host and producer of The Works, a weekly interview program from Seattle public radio station KUOW which focused on business and technology. Moe also hosted The Power of Voice, a weekly listener call-in show on local and national issues. He had been working for two and a half years as a feature reporter and occasional host when he became the senior staff reporter and sometimes host with Weekend America.

Previously, Moe was a freelance reporter and later a senior reporter at American Public Media radio program Weekend America. On August 16, 2008 he became host to replace show founder Bill Radke and Radke's co-host Desiree Cooper, who became a senior correspondent for Weekend America. Moe developed and wrote the weekly segment "A Little Bit of Weather Everywhere", presenting unique events happening around the country, and the weather for the day at these events. Prior to joining Weekend America full-time as a senior writer in 2007, he worked for NPR affiliate station KUOW-FM in Seattle, Washington where he hosted and produced The Works, a weekly program dedicated to business and technology.

He became the host of American Public Media's Future Tense on May 3, 2010. On Monday, September 20, 2010, Future Tense changed its name to Marketplace Tech Report as it became part of the Marketplace portfolio of programs. On September 10, 2012, Moe left Marketplace Tech Report to devote his full-time attention to hosting the radio variety show Wits. Wits was a stage and radio show performed in the Fitzgerald Theater. It began in 2010, and a podcast was created in 2012. The show consists of interviews, comedic sketches, musical performances, and a game show between the two guests, who have included George Takei, Maria Bamford, David Cross, and Neil Gaiman.

Writing

Moe is the author of Dear Luke, We Need To Talk, Darth: and Other Pop Culture Correspondences, published in June 2014. The book is a compilation of fictitious letters, notes, and messages based around familiar songs, movies, TV shows, and sporting events. He is also the author of Conservatize Me: How I Tried to Become a Righty with the Help of Richard Nixon, Sean Hannity, Toby Keith, and Beef Jerky, published in October 2006. The book chronicles Moe's attempt to become a conservative. The book contains several encounters with political experts, historians, and enthusiasts of all affiliations.

His work has appeared in the McSweeney's anthologies Created in Darkness by Troubled Americans, The McSweeney's Joke Book of Book Jokes, and Mountain Man Dance Moves.

He is also the author of Pop Song Correspondences, a feature on the McSweeney's website, which is now a recurring segment on the Wits radio show.

He previously worked at Amazon.com in an editorial capacity and at a staffing agency providing legal placement services.

Podcasts 
In June 2015, Moe along with rapper Open Mike Eagle launched Conversation Parade, a podcast in which the two discuss the Cartoon Network animated series Adventure Time. The podcast has featured guests like Jeremy Shada (the voice of Finn the Human), John DiMaggio (the voice of Jake the Dog), Hynden Walch (the voice of Princess Bubblegum), Adam Muto (the series' co-executive producer and showrunner), Kent Osborne (Adventure Times head writer), Niki Yang (the voice of BMO and Lady Rainicorn), Olivia Olson (the voice of Marceline), Jesse Moynihan (former storyboard artist), Jessica DiCicco (the voice of Flame Princess), Elizabeth Ito (one of the show's supervising directors), and alternative country musician Neko Case.

In 2016, Dr. Craig Bowron MD FACP, contributor at Huffington Post, wrote an article announcing and recommending a new podcast by John Moe, The Hilarious World of Depression.

Moe began the Depresh Mode podcast in March 2021.

Personal life
Moe lives in St. Paul, Minnesota.

Works

Radio shows developed 

 The Works
 "A Little Bit of Weather Everywhere", weekly segment on Weekend America
 "Pop Song Correspondences", segment on Wits

Podcasts developed 

 Conversation Parade
 The Hilarious World of Depression
 Depresh Mode

Radio shows hosted 

 The Works
 Weekend America
 Future Tense/Marketplace Tech
 Wits

Books 

 Conservatize Me: How I Tried to Become a Righty with the Help of Richard Nixon, Sean Hannity, Toby Keith, and Beef Jerky (2006)
 Dear Luke, We Need To Talk, Darth: and Other Pop Culture Correspondences (2014)
 The Deleted E-Mails of Hillary Clinton: A Parody (2015)
 The Hilarious World of Depression (2020)

References

External links
 Audio interview with Moe on public radio program The Sound of Young America
 Announcement of hosting change for Weekend America
 Pop Song Correspondences
 The Hilarious World of Depression with John Moe
 Depresh Mode with John Moe

American political commentators
American political writers
Place of birth missing (living people)
American male non-fiction writers
American public radio personalities
Radio personalities from Seattle
Whitman College alumni
Living people
1968 births